Yevgeniya Nikandrovna Khanayeva (January 2, 1921 – November 8, 1987) was a Soviet and Russian film and stage actress. People's Artist of the USSR (1987).

Biography 
She was born in Bogorodsk to a famous opera singer Nikandr Khanayev.

Selected filmography
 Monologue (1972)
 Day by Day (1972)
  Strange Adults (1974)
 Practical Joke (1976)
 Moscow Does Not Believe in Tears (1979)
 The Old New Year (1980)
 Simply Awful! (1982)
 Mother Mary (1983)
 Crazy Day of Engineer Barkasov (1983)
 The Blonde Around the Corner (1984)

Honors and awards 

 Medal "Veteran of Labour"
 Medal "In Commemoration of the 800th Anniversary of Moscow" (1949)
 Honored Artist of the RSFSR (1963)
 Order of the Badge of Honour (1967)
 People's Artist of the RSFSR (1977)
 People's Artist of the USSR (1987)

References

External links
 

1921 births
1987 deaths
20th-century Russian actresses
People from Noginsk
Moscow Art Theatre School alumni
Honored Artists of the RSFSR
People's Artists of the RSFSR
People's Artists of the USSR
Russian film actresses
Russian stage actresses
Russian voice actresses
Soviet film actresses
Soviet stage actresses
Soviet voice actresses
Burials at Vvedenskoye Cemetery